Symbolanthus, the ring‐gentians, are a genus of flowering plants in the family Gentianaceae, native to the montane tropics of southern Central America and northern and eastern South America.

Species
Species currently accepted by The Plant List are as follows: 
Symbolanthus anomalus (Kunth) Gilg
Symbolanthus aureus  Struwe & V.A.Albert
Symbolanthus australis  Struwe
Symbolanthus brittonianus  Gilg
Symbolanthus camanensis  Maguire & B.M.Boom
Symbolanthus elisabethae  (M.R.Schomb.) Gilg
Symbolanthus frigidus  (Sw.) Struwe & K.R. Gould
Symbolanthus huachamacariensis  Steyerm.
Symbolanthus latifolius  Gilg
Symbolanthus macranthus  (Benth.) Moldenke
Symbolanthus magnificus  Gilg
Symbolanthus mathewsii  (Griseb.) Ewan
Symbolanthus nerioides  (Griseb.) Ewan
Symbolanthus pauciflorus  Spruce ex Gilg
Symbolanthus pterocalyx  Struwe
Symbolanthus pulcherrimus  Gilg
Symbolanthus rosmarinifolius  Struwe & V.A.Albert
Symbolanthus sessilis  Steyerm. & Maguire
Symbolanthus tetrapterus  Struwe
Symbolanthus tricolor  Gilg
Symbolanthus vasculosus  (Griseb.) Gilg
Symbolanthus yaviensis  Steyerm.

References

Gentianaceae genera
Gentianaceae